Yousif Saeed (born 4 September 1994) is an Emirati footballer who currently plays for Al Bataeh as a forward.

Honours 
Al Ahli
Runners-up
 UAE Division 1 Group A: 2012–13
 UAE League Cup: 2014–15

References

External links 
 

1994 births
Living people
Emirati footballers
Association football forwards
UAE First Division League players
UAE Pro League players
Sharjah FC players
Hatta Club players
Al Bataeh Club players